Bari Kola may refer to:
 Bari Kola (Bārī Kolā) (باريكلا - Bārī Kolā)
 Bari Kola (Barī Kolā) (بريكلا - Barī Kolā)